The 2017 ESPY Awards were presented at the 25th annual ESPY Awards show, held on July 12, 2017 at 5 pm Pacific at the Microsoft Theater in Los Angeles, California and on television nationwide in the United States on ABC at 8 pm Eastern/7 PM Central. On May 16, 2017, it was announced by ESPN.com that Peyton Manning would host the show. 33 competitive awards were presented, along with several honorary awards.

Winners and nominees 
These were the nominees for each of the competitive awards. Fans were able to vote online at a dedicated ESPN site. For "Best Play", fans voted on the plays Bracket-styled, with Round 1 of voting lasting from June 21 to June 27, Round 2 of voting lasting from June 28 to July 4, Round 3 of voting lasting from July 5 to July 11, and Round 4 of voting being on the day of the show, July 12.

Honorary awards

Arthur Ashe Courage Award

 Eunice Kennedy Shriver

Jimmy V Perseverance Award

 Jarrius Robertson

Pat Tillman Award for Service

 U.S. Air Force Master Sgt. Israel Del Toro

Best Moment
 Chicago Cubs win the World Series.

Icon Award
 Vin Scully

Muhammad Ali Humanitarian Award
Mark Giordano of the Calgary Flames, NHL

Special Olympic Athletes
 Kindlelon “Kobie” Respicio for accomplishments in the Special Olympics and success in school

In Memoriam

During the segment the music was "The Song for You" performed by Gallant.

John Saunders
José Fernández
Dennis Byrd
Ralph Branca
Dennis Green
Dan Rooney
Yordano Ventura
Bobby Chacon
Jerry Krause
Frank Deford
Nate Thurmond
Rubén Amaro Sr.
Dallas Green
LaVell Edwards
Jack McCloskey
Sam Foltz
Craig Sager
Jim Bunning
Fab Melo
Joao Havelange
Mike Ilitch
Joe McKnight
Jimmy Piersall
John Andariese
Cortez Kennedy
Luis Olmo
Rashaan Salaam
Bernie Custis
Herve Filion
Gene Conley
Tony DiCicco
Arnold Palmer

References

External links
 http://www.espn.com/espys/

2017
ESPY
ESPY
ESPY
ESPY